Jean-Jacques Nzadi da Conceição (born 3 April 1964, in Kinshasa), more commonly known as J.J. Conceição or Jean-Jacques, is an Angolan-Portuguese retired professional basketball player. A 2.02 m (6'7 "), 100 kg (220 lbs.) power forward, he represented Angola at the AfroBasket, where he won a record seven African titles. At the club level, he won five Angolan League championship titles with Primeiro de Agosto and four Angolan Cups, before moving to Benfica in Portugal, where he won seven Portuguese national championships and three Portuguese Federation Cups. He also went on to play for CSP Limoges in France, Baloncesto Málaga in Spain, and  Portugal Telecom in Portugal.

Professional career
Even though he never played in the NBA, Jean-Jacques enjoyed a successful career in Europe, especially in Portugal, where he won 10 Portuguese national championships (7 with Benfica and 3 with Portugal Telecom), 7 Portuguese Federation Cups (5 with Benfica and 2 with Portugal Telecom), 5 Portuguese Super Cups (4 with Benfica and 1 with Portugal Telecom), and 6 Portuguese League Cups (all with Benfica).

National team career
As a member of the senior Angolan national team, Conceição won seven AfroBasket gold medals, namely in 1989, 1992, 1993, 1995, 1999, 2001, and 2003. He also won silver medals in 1983 and 1985, and a bronze medal in 1997. 

He also played for his country at the FIBA World Cup in 1986, 1990, and 1994. He also played at the Summer Olympic Games in 1992, where he faced the famed Dream Team. The Americans won easily, 116-48, but Conceição led the Angolans with ten points, seven rebounds and two assists.

Post-career
In 2011, in Antananarivo, within the celebrations of the 50th anniversary of FIBA Africa, Jacques was named the most valuable player in African basketball history.

On 19 June 2013, Jean-Jacques became a FIBA Hall of Fame player.

Titles and medals won

Pro clubs

Angolan junior national team

Angolan senior national team

Personal life
Jean-Jacques Conceição is the father to Angolan-Portuguese basketball player Jacques Conceição.

References

External links
 
FIBA Profile
FIBA EuroLeague Profile
FIBA Europe Profile
FIBA Hall of Fame Profile
Spanish League Profile 

1964 births
Living people
Angolan expatriate sportspeople in Spain
Angolan men's basketball players
1990 FIBA World Championship players
Baloncesto Málaga players
Basketball players at the 1992 Summer Olympics
Basketball players at the 1996 Summer Olympics
C.D. Primeiro de Agosto men's basketball players
FIBA Hall of Fame inductees
Liga ACB players
Limoges CSP players
Olympic basketball players of Angola
Portuguese men's basketball players
Power forwards (basketball)
S.L. Benfica basketball players
Basketball players from Kinshasa
1986 FIBA World Championship players
1994 FIBA World Championship players
Portuguese people of Angolan descent